The Official Roll of the Baronetage is an official list of baronets kept by the Lord Chancellor; an abridged version is published online by the Standing Council of the Baronetage.

Any person who wishes to claim succession to a baronetcy must produce the necessary proof of succession; there are many heirs to baronetcies who have not done so.

As of January 2020, there are 1,245 baronetcies on the official roll (including about 200 with no incumbent because succession is dormant or unproven); of these 142 are of England, 60 of Ireland, 116 of Scotland, 125 of Great Britain and 802 of the United Kingdom. Of the current baronets, 254 are also peers. The oldest baronetage by date of creation (the Premier Baronet) is Sir Nicholas Bacon, 14th Baronet of Redgrave whose title was created in 1611.

See also 
 Roll of the Peerage
 Standing Council of the Baronetage
 Baronetage of the United Kingdom
 Baronetage of England
 Baronetage of Nova Scotia
 Baronetage of Ireland
 Baronetage of Great Britain

References

External links
 Official website